Maryam Noor (Urdu: مریم نور) or Maryam Noor Sheikh is a Pakistani actress and model. She is known for her roles in dramas, Ab Dekh Khuda Kya Karta Hai, Silsilay and Malaal-e-Yaar.

Early life
Maryam was born on October 10, 1994 in Karachi, Pakistan. She completed her studies from University of Karachi with degree of LLB.

Career
She made her debut as an actress in 2015. She gain popularity in drama Ab Dekh Khuda Kya Karta Hai as Erum. In 2018 she did a lot of lead roles in Haiwan, Ro Raha Hai Dil and Mein Muhabbat Aur Tum which were a success and she gained a lot of attention. The very same year she also did modeling for various magazine, designers and companies. She also amazed the audience when she did different characters in various dramas. In 2019 she was a well known actress, she did lead role in Soya Mera Naseeb, Chand Ki Pariyan and Malaal-e-Yaar.

Personal life
In 2022 Maryam married Ismail Butt a pilot teacher on November 29.

Filmography

Television

Telefilm

Film

References

External links
 
 
 

1994 births
Living people
Pakistani television actresses
21st-century Pakistani actresses
Pakistani film actresses